Diana bag may refer to a variety of bag collections named after Diana, Princess of Wales; including:
 Gucci Diana, by the Florence-based luxury fashion house Gucci
 Lady Dior, by the Paris-based luxury fashion house Dior